Rafael Salvador Salguero González (born 10 August 1951 in Lima, Peru) is  a Peruvian retired football defender. He competed for the Peru national football team at the 1982 FIFA World Cup.

Club career
At club level he played for Alianza Lima in Peru.

International career
Salguero made 13 appearances for the Peru national football team.

See also
1982 FIFA World Cup squads

References

External links

1951 births
Living people
Footballers from Lima
Association football defenders
Peruvian footballers
Peru international footballers
1982 FIFA World Cup players
FBC Melgar footballers
Club Alianza Lima footballers